Casualty estimation often refers to the process of statistically estimating the number of injuries or deaths in a battle or natural disaster that has already occurred. Estimates based on detailed information on individual deaths, but also extending to statistical extrapolations, became known as casualty recording in the early twenty-first century. Casualty prediction is the process of estimating the number of injuries or deaths that might occur in a planned or potential battle or natural disaster.

Measures used to imply casualties include:
 Reported number of kills
 Number of enemy individual weapons captured after engagement
 Number of tanks and aircraft lost
 Remote sensing of mass graves

Methods

Measurement and signature intelligence alone cannot give a reasonable estimate of casualties. What Spectroscopic MASINT can do is help find mass graves. Geophysical MASINT can help localize metal and possibly bodies at that site. TECHINT is needed if there are weapons or artifacts to analyze.  IMINT has a role to play in  tracking movements. These all have to combine with all-source analysis. Perhaps the losses of tanks and aircraft, if available, might better predict what actually happened in a battle. MASINT's mass graves capability is a means that has been used for remote sensing of clandestine mass graves.

Author Sam Adams' book, War of Numbers discusses, in great detail, a process of casualty estimation.  Adams was a CIA analyst who eventually resigned over what he felt was political manipulation of casualty figures in the Vietnam War. He explains how he came up with casualty figures for the NLF and PAVN.  Adams, and other U.S. analysts dealing with a guerilla war in jungle, found there were better metrics than "body count". David Hackworth, for example, used number of enemy weapons captured after an engagement, and that turned out to be a good predictor of casualties, with certain limits.

Earthquakes

Recent advances are improving the speed and accuracy of loss estimates immediately after earthquakes (within less than an hour) so that injured people may be rescued more efficiently. After major and large earthquakes, rescue agencies and civil defense managers rapidly need quantitative estimates of the extent of the potential disaster, at a time when information from the affected area may not yet have reached the outside world. For the injured below the rubble every minute counts.
To rapidly provide estimates of the extent of an earthquake disaster is much less of a problem in industrialized than in developing countries. This article focuses on how one can estimate earthquake losses in developing countries in real time.

See also

 Body count
 Casualty prediction
 Loss Exchange Ratio

References

External links
Related article in Canadian Society of Forensic Science Journal

Measurement and signature intelligence
Military intelligence
Military science